The emblem of the Commonwealth of Independent States depicts a yellow sun on a dark blue field, with eight bending poles holding the sun.

Description

The design (which reflects the one of the flag of the Commonwealth) symbolizes the desire for equal partnership, unity, peace and stability.

See also
Flag of the Commonwealth of Independent States
Branding national myths and symbols

References

Commonwealth of Independent States
Commonwealth Of Independent States